Optimist International is an international service club organization with almost 3,000 clubs and over 80,000 members in more than 20 countries. The international headquarters is located in St. Louis, Missouri, United States. Optimist International is also the sponsor of Junior Optimist International, designed for elementary school through high school aged youth.

Optimist International's motto is "Friend of Youth" and the organization also uses the branding statement "Bringing Out the Best in Youth, in our Communities, and in Ourselves."

Organization
Optimist International is made up of autonomous Optimist Clubs that do work in their communities. Each club raises its own funds and chooses its own service projects to improve the lives of children. Examples of typical projects include sponsoring youth athletic leagues, holding essay and oratorical contests for scholarships, and supporting local schools.

History
The international organization was founded at a convention in Louisville, Kentucky, in 1919. It united various local and regional clubs, the first of which had been founded in Buffalo, New York, in 1911. At the convention, the first official charter of the international organization was awarded to the club in Downtown Indianapolis, Indiana which had been founded in 1916.

Several Optimist clubs participated in the June 1917 organization meeting of the Lions Clubs International held in Chicago, Illinois. However, the delegates sent by the clubs opted not to join the new organization and withdrew from the meeting.

Organizational philosophy
Optimist International sets out statements of mission, vision and purpose. These summarize its goals to aid and encourage youth development.

In 1922, the Optimist Creed was adopted as the official creed of the organization. The Optimist Creed was developed by Christian D. Larson. It details a number of pledges to which members attempt to adhere.

References

External links

 
 Optimist clubs serve their community
 Optimist Club projects from around the world

Service organizations based in the United States
Organizations based in St. Louis
Organizations established in 1919
1919 establishments in Kentucky